Marpissa pikei is a species of jumping spider that is found in the eastern United States, Texas, New Mexico, Arizona and Cuba.

Description
Marpissa pikei has a very elongated form, which enables it to hide while stretching along twigs or blades of grass. It rests by extending its first two pairs of legs in front of its body and the remaining two pairs posteriorly. 

Both sexes are about 8 mm long, excluding the legs. While the male has a broad black median stripe spanning the whole body and orange first legs and carapace orange, the female has a duller coloration, with the abdomen pale cream-colored, speckled with black.

Habits
These spiders are very hard to find when not moving. Once they do move, they do so exceedingly quick and jerky. The enlarged first pair of legs is not used in walking, but are extended in front. When males spot a female, they approach it with their front legs extended and waving, prior to mating.

Distribution
They are usually found on low grasses. Kaston (1981) reports it as readily swept from tall grasses, especially along seashores. In Kansas, adults are found from May to October.

Name
This species is commonly called Pike Slender Jumper or Long-bodied Jumping Spider.

Notes

References

  (1963): Spiders of The University of Kansas Natural History Reservation and Rockefeller Experimental Tract. 
  (1981): Spiders of Connecticut. Nat. Hist. Survey Connecticut, Bull.
 Awesome Spiders: Marpissa pikei (with photographs of male and female)
  (2009): The world spider catalog, version 9.5. American Museum of Natural History.

Salticidae
Spiders of the United States
Spiders of the Caribbean
Spiders described in 1888